2-Oxoglutarate receptor 1 (OXGR1), also known as cysteinyl leukotriene receptor E (CysLTE) and GPR99, is a protein that in humans is encoded by the  (also termed GPR99) gene. The Gene has recently been nominated as a receptor not only for 2-oxogluterate (see alpha-Ketoglutaric acid) but also for the three cysteinyl leukotrienes (CysLTs), particularly leukotriene E4 (LTE4) and to far lesser extents LTC4 and LTE4. Recent studies implicate GPR99 as a cellular receptor which is activated by LTE4 thereby causing these cells to contribute to mediating various allergic and hypersensitivity responses.

History 
In 2001, a gene projected to code for a G protein-like receptor protein was reported; the gene's apparent protein product was classified as an orphan receptor (i.e., a receptor whose activating ligand and function were unknown) and named GPR80. The projected amino acid sequence of the protein encoded by the GPR80 gene bore similarities to a purinergic receptor, P2Y1, and therefore might, like P2Y1, be a receptor for purine compounds. Shortly thereafter, a second report found this same gene, indicated that it coded for a G protein receptor with its amino acid sequence similarities closest to purinergic receptors GPR91 and P2Y1, and named the gene and its protein GPR99 and GPR99, respectively. While the latter report found that a large series of purinergic nucleotides, other nucleotides, and derivatives of these compounds did not activate GPR99-bearing cells, a third report in 2004 found that GPR99-bearing cells bound and responded to two purines, adenosine and Adenosine monophosphate, nominated GPR99 as a true purinergic receptor, and renamed GPR99 as P2Y15. However, a review of these studies in the same year by members of the International Union of Pharmacology (IUPHAR) Subcommittee for P2Y receptor nomenclature and classification decided that GPR80/GPR99 is not a P2Y receptor for adenosine, AMP or other nucleotides. Again in 2004, another report found that GPR99-bearing cells responded to alpha-ketoglutarate. This report was accepted by IUPHAR. The gene and its protein were renamed OXGR1 and OXGR1. Finally, in 2013, GPR99-bearing cells were found to bind and respond to CysLTs. The latter finding, while attracting further studies and of potential clinical importance, has not yet lead to a renaming of GPR99 nor its protein product.

Gene and product 
GPR99 (OXGR1) is localized to human chromosome 13 at position 13q32.2; it codes for a cellular G protein coupled receptor linked primarily to G protein heterotrimers containing the Gq subunit; when bound to one of its activating ligands, the GPR99 protein stimulates cellular pathways (see Gq alpha subunit#Function) that lead to cell function.

Activating ligands 
GPR99 appears to be the receptor for alpha-ketoglutarate (AKG) and CysLTs. CyslTs and AKG have the following relative potencies in binding to GPR99-bearing cells, LTE4>>LTC4=LTD4>AKG; LTE4 is able to stimulate responses in these cells at concentrations as low as picomole/liter.

Inhibiting ligands 
GPR99 is inhibited by montelukast, a well-known and clinically useful inhibitor of cysteinyl leukotriene receptor 1 (CysLTR1); this drug binds to CysLTR1 thereby blocking the binding and action of LTD4, LTC4, and LTE4. It is presumed to act similarly to block the actins of these cystienyl leukotrienes on GPR99. It is not known if other CysLTR1 inhibitors (see Cysteinyl leukotriene receptor 1#Clinical significance) can mimic montelukast in blocking GPR99.

Expression 
Based on their content of GPR99 mRNA, GPR99 is expressed in human kidney, placenta, fetal brain, and tissues involved in allergic and hypersensitivity reactions such as the lung trachea, salivary glands, eosinophils, mast cells derived from umbilical cord blood, and nasal mucosa, particularly the vascular smooth muscle in the latter tissue. In mice, Gpr99 mRNA is expressed in kidneys, testes, and smooth muscle.

Function 
GPR99 binds as is activated by LTE4 at concentrations far lower than the other major CysLT receptors, Cysteinyl leukotriene receptor 1 (CysLTR1) and Cysteinyl leukotriene receptor 2 (CysLTR2), both of which appear to be physiological receptors for LTD4 and LTC4 but not LTF4 (see Cysteinyl leukotriene receptor 1#Function). This suggests that the actions of LTE4 are mediated, at least to a large extent, by GPR99. Several findings support this notion: a) pretreatment of guinea pig trachea and human bronchial smooth muscle with LTE4 but not LTC4 or LTD4 enhances their contraction responses to histamine; b) LTE4 is as potent as LTC4 and LTD4 in eliciting vascular leakage when injected into the skin of guinea pigs and humans; c) inhalation of LTE4 but not LTD4 by asthmatic subjects caused the accumulation of eosinophils and basophils in their bronchial mucosa; d) mice engineered to lack Cysltr1 and Cysltr2 receptors exhibited edema responses to the interdermal injection of LTC4, LTD4, and LTE4 but only LTE4 was more potent (by a factor of 64-fold) proved more potent in these mice compared to in wild type mice; and e) mice engineered to lack all three Cysltr1, Cysltr2, and Gpr99 receptors showed no dermal edema responses to the injection of LTC4, LTD4, or LTE4. 

Mice deficient in Gpr99 (i.e. Oxgr1-/- gene knockout mice) develop (82% penetrance) spontaneous Otitis media with many characteristics of the human disease; while the underlying cause of this development, the Oxgr1-/- mouse is proposed to be a good model to study and relate to human ear pathology.

GPR99 also appears to be involved in the adaptive regulation of bicarbonate (HCO(3)(-)) secretion and salt (NaCl) reabsorption in the mouse kidneys undergoing acid-base stress: the kidneys of GPR99 gene knockout mice did not respond to alpha-Ketoglutaric acid by upregulating bicarbonate/NaCl exchange and exhibited a reduced ability to maintain acid-base balance.

Clinical significance 
Montelucast is in use to treat various conditions including asthma, exercise-induced bronchoconstriction, allergic rhinitis, primary dysmenorrhoea (i.e. dysmenorrhoea not associated with known causes; see dysmenorrhea#Causes), and urticaria. It has been presumed that this drug's beneficial effects in these diseases is due to its well-known ability to act as a receptor antagonist for the cysteinyl leukotriene receptor 1 (CysLTR1), i.e. it binds to but does not activate this receptor thereby interfering with LTD4, LTC4, and LTE4 provocative actions by blocking their binding to CysLTR1 (the drug does not block the cysteinyl leukotriene receptor 2) (see cysteinyl leukotriene receptor 1#Clinical significance). The more recently discovered ability of this drug to block the ability of LTE4 and LTD4 to stimulate GPR99 in GPR99-bearing cells  allows that montelucast's beneficial effects on these conditions might reflect its ability to block not only CysLTR1 but also GPR99.

References

Further reading 

 
 
 

G protein-coupled receptors